Dave or David Shea may refer to:

 Dave Shea (sportscaster) (born c. 1950), Irish-American ice hockey sportscaster
 Dave Shea (web designer) (active from 2003), Canadian web designer and author
 David Shea (linguist) (1777–1836), Irish Orientalist and translator